Berthold Furtmeyr was a German miniaturist, attested as a citizen of Regensburg between 1470 and 1501.

He contributed to an Old Testament manuscript of G. Rorer between 1470 and 1472. His main work is the decoration of a missal of five volumes for archbishop Bernhard von Rohr, completed in 1481 or 1482.

Literature
Edeltraud Jantschke: Stilkritische Beschreibung der Miniaturen des Regensburger Illuministen Berthold Furtmeyr. Erlangen 1951.
Alheidis von Rohr: Berthold Furtmeyr und die Regensburger Buchmalerei des 15. Jahrhunderts. Bonn 1967
Johannes Janota (Hrsg.): Die Furtmeyr-Bibel in der Universitätsbibliothek Augsburg. Kommentar. Augsburg: Presse-Druck- und Verlags-GmbH 1990

References

15th-century births
16th-century deaths
Manuscript illuminators